WinRAR is a trialware file archiver utility for Windows, developed by Eugene Roshal of win.rar GmbH. It can create and view archives in RAR or ZIP file formats, and unpack numerous archive file formats. To enable the user to test the integrity of archives, WinRAR embeds CRC32 or BLAKE2 checksums for each file in each archive. WinRAR supports creating encrypted, multi-part and self-extracting archives.

WinRAR is a Windows-only program. An Android application called "RAR for Android" is also available. Related programs include the command-line utilities "RAR" and "UNRAR" and versions for macOS, Linux, FreeBSD, Windows CE, and MS-DOS.

Evolution

WinRAR and the RAR file format have evolved over time. Support for the archive format RAR5, using the same RAR file extension as earlier versions, was added in version 5.0; the older RAR file format has since been referred to as RAR4. WinRAR versions before 5.0 do not support RAR5 archives; only older versions of WinRAR run on Windows versions prior to Windows Vista, and cannot open RAR5 archives.

The RAR5 file format increased the maximum dictionary size to 1 GB; 11 different compression directory sizes from 1 MB to 1 GB are available, with the default in version 5 increased from 4 MB to 32 MB, typically improving compression ratio. AES encryption, when used, is in CBC mode and was increased in strength from 128- to 256-bit. Maximum path length for files in RAR and ZIP archives is increased to 2,048 characters.

Options added in v5.0 include 256-bit BLAKE2 file-hashing algorithm instead of default 32-bit CRC32, duplicate file detection, NTFS hard and symbolic links, and Quick Open record to allow large archives to be opened faster.

The RAR5 file format removed comments for each file (though archive comment still remains), authenticity verification, and specialized compression algorithms for text and multimedia files. RAR5 also changed the file name for split volumes from "archivename.rNN" to "archivename.partNN.rar".

Features
 Creation of packed RAR or ZIP archives.
 Unpacking of ARJ, BZIP2, CAB, GZ, ISO, JAR, LHA, RAR, TAR, UUE, XZ, Z, ZIP, ZIPX, ZST, 7z, UUE 001 (split) archives, as well as EXE files containing these archive formats
 Checksum (integrity) verification for ARJ, BZIP2, CAB, GZ, BZIP2, RAR, XZ, ZIP and 7z archives
 Multithreaded CPU compression and decompression

When creating RAR archives:
 Support for maximum file size of 16 EiB, about 1.8 × 1019 bytes or 18 million TB
 Compression dictionary from 1 MiB to 1 GiB (it is limited to 256 MiB on 32-bit editions of Windows, although 32-bit Windows still can decompress archives with 1 GiB dictionary; default size is 32 MiB)
 Optional 256-bit BLAKE2 file hash can replace default 32-bit CRC32 file checksum
 Optional encryption using AES with a 256-bit key in CBC mode, using key derivation function based on PBKDF2 using HMAC-SHA256
 Optional data redundancy is provided in the form of Reed–Solomon recovery records and recovery volumes, allowing reconstruction of damaged archives (including reconstruction of entirely missed volumes)
 Optional "quick open record" to open RAR files faster
 Ability to create multi-volume (split) archives
 Ability to create self-extracting files (multi-volume self-extracting archives are supported; the self-extractor can execute commands, such as running a specified program before or after self-extraction)
 Support for advanced NTFS file system options, such as NTFS hard and symbolic links
 Support for maximum path length up to 2,048 characters (stored in the UTF-8 format)
 Optional archive comment (stored in the UTF-8 format)
 Optional file time stamp preservation: creation, last access, high precision modification times
 Optional file deduplication
 Advanced backup options, time-stamped files and previous file version retention.

License
The software is distributed as "try before you buy"; it may be used without charge for 40 days. When the period expires, the non-enterprise functionalities remain available, a move intended to discourage piracy. In China, a free-to-use personal edition has been provided officially since 2015.

Although archiving with the RAR format is proprietary, RARLAB supplies as copyrighted freeware the C++ source code of the current UnRAR unpacker, with a license allowing it to be used in any software, thus enabling others to produce software capable of unpacking, but not creating, RAR archives.

RAR for Android is free of charge. It displays advertisements; for a payment they can be disabled. A license for WinRAR does not provide ad-suppression for RAR for Android.

Security
In February 2019, a major security vulnerability in the unacev2.dll library which is used by WinRAR to decompress ACE archives was discovered. Consequently, WinRAR dropped the support for the ACE format from version 5.70.

Self-extracting archives created with versions before 5.31 (including the executable installer of WinRAR itself) are vulnerable to DLL hijacking: they may load and use DLLs named UXTheme.dll, RichEd32.dll and RichEd20.dll if they are in the same folder as the executable file.

It was widely reported that WinRAR v5.21 and earlier had a remote code execution (RCE) vulnerability which could allow a remote attacker to insert malicious code into a self-extracting executable (SFX) file being created by a user, "putting over 500 million users of the software at risk". However, examination of the claim revealed that, while the vulnerability existed, the result was merely an SFX which delivered its payload when executed; published responses dismissed the threat, one saying "If you can find suckers who will trust a .exe labelled as self-extracting archive ... then you can trick them into running your smuggled JavaScript".

History

Versions
 Command line RAR and UNRAR were first released in autumn 1993.
 Early development version WinRAR 1.54b was released in 1995 as Windows 3.x software.
 3.00 (2002-05): the new RAR3 archive format is implemented. The new archives cannot be managed by older versions of WinRAR. Solid compression and WAV audio lossless compression features are added.
 3.41 (2004-12): adds support for Linux .Z archives like GZIP and BZIP2. New options include storing entire file paths and restoring compressed NTFS files.
 3.50 (2005-08): adds support for interface skins and Windows XP Professional x64 Edition.
 3.60 (2006-08): adds multithreaded version of the compression algorithm, which improves compression speed on systems with multiple dual-core or hyper-threading-enabled CPUs.
 3.80 (2008-09): adds support for ZIP archives, which contain Unicode file names in UTF-8.
 3.90 (2009-05): adds support for the x86-64 architecture and Windows 7. Multithreaded support is enhanced.
 3.91 is the last release that supports Valencian.
 3.92 is the last release that supports Serbian Cyrillic and Serbian Latin.
 4.00 (2011-03): decompression is sped up by up to 30%. Windows 98, Windows ME, and Windows NT are no longer supported; the minimum Windows version required is Windows 2000.
 4.10 (2012-01): removes all ZIP limitations now allowing unlimited number of files and archive size. WinRAR now also allows creation of multivolume ZIP files. ZIP archives now include Unicode file names.
 4.20 (2012-06): compression speed in SMP mode is increased significantly, but this improvement was made at the expense of increased memory usage. ZIP compression now uses SMP as well. The default SMP mode cannot handle text; text compression is significantly worse unless additional switches are used. Also, Windows 2000 compatibility was removed.
 5.00 (2013-09): the RAR5 archive format is implemented. RAR5 compressed archives cannot be managed by old versions of WinRAR. The RAR 5 format improves multi-core processor utilization, and adds a larger dictionary size of up to 1 GiB with 64-bit WinRAR. Special optional compression algorithms optimized for RGB bitmaps, raw audio files, Itanium executables, and plain text, which were supported by earlier versions, are supported only in the older RAR format, not RAR5. Optional optimized compression of x86 executables and delta compression (for structured table data) are supported in both file formats.
 5.50 (2017-08): adds support for a master password which can be used to encrypt passwords stored in WinRAR. The default RAR format is changed to version 5. Adds support for decompressing Lzip archives; adds support for high precision file dates, longer file names and larger file sizes for TAR archives.
 5.60 (2018-06): repairing of protected RAR5 archives was improved. Automatic detection of the encoding of ZIP archive comments. Recognition of GZIP files with arbitrary preceding data as an actual GZIP archive.
 5.70 (2019-02): removes support for ACE archive decompression due to major security vulnerabilities in the unacev2.dll library.
 6.00 (2020-12): "Ignore" and "Ignore All" options are added to read error prompt. "Ignore" allows to continue processing with already read file part only and "Ignore All" does it for all future read errors.
 6.10 (2022-01): Dropped Windows XP support. Added support for unpacking ZST archives. Maximum recovery record is increased to 1000% of protected data size.
 6.11 (2022-03): Support of Gzip archives with large archive comments has been added; In command line mode, the switch -mes can also be used to suppress the password prompt and abort when adding new files to an encrypted solid archive.
 6.12 (2022-05):  security vulnerability is fixed in Unix RAR versions. WinRAR and Android RAR are not affected.

Operating systems support
More recent versions do not support many older operating systems. Versions supporting older operating systems may still be available, but not maintained:
 RAR 2.50 (1999) is the last version that supports MS-DOS and OS/2 on 16-bit x86 CPUs (8086-compatible).
 RAR 3.93 is the last version for MS-DOS and OS/2 on IA-32 CPUs (80386 equivalents and later). It supports file names longer than the MS-DOS standard of 8.3 characters, in a Windows DOS box (except under Windows NT), and uses the RSX DPMI extender.
 WinRAR 2.06 is the last version to support Windows 3.1, Windows NT 3.1, Windows NT 3.5, Windows NT 3.51 and Win32s.
 WinRAR 3.93 is the last version to support Windows 95, 98, ME, and NT 4.0. RAR for Pocket PC 3.93 is the last version for Windows Mobile.
 WinRAR 4.11 is the last version to support Windows 2000.
WinRAR 6.02 is the last version to support Windows XP.

See also
 Comparison of file archivers
 Comparison of archive formats
 List of archive formats
 7-zip

References

Further reading

External links
 rarlab.com
 RAR 5.0 archive file format
 Critical vulnerability in all WinRAR's versions prior to 5.7

File archivers
1995 software
Windows compression software
Windows-only shareware
Disk image extractors